Reemt Pyka (born 11 January 1969) is a German ice hockey player. He competed in the men's tournament at the 1998 Winter Olympics.

Career statistics

Regular season and playoffs

International

References

1969 births
Living people
Olympic ice hockey players of Germany
Ice hockey players at the 1998 Winter Olympics
Sportspeople from Bremerhaven